The Wind Energy Holding Bangkok Open is a professional tennis tournament played on hard courts. It is currently part of the ATP Challenger Tour. It is held annually in Bangkok, Thailand, since 2016.

Past finals

Singles

Doubles

 
2016 establishments in Thailand
2016 disestablishments in Thailand
Tennis
Tennis
ATP Challenger Tour
Hard court tennis tournaments
August sporting events
September sporting events
Recurring sporting events established in 2016
Recurring events disestablished in 2016
Tennis
Tennis in Bangkok
Tennis tournaments in Thailand
Defunct tennis tournaments in Thailand